is a Japanese football player. He plays for Tochigi SC.

Playing career
Tasuku Hiraoka joined to J1 League club FC Tokyo in 2014.

Career statistics
Updated to 23 February 2018.

References

External links
Profile at FC Tokyo

1996 births
Living people
People from Kashihara, Nara
Association football people from Nara Prefecture
Japanese footballers
J1 League players
J3 League players
FC Tokyo players
FC Tokyo U-23 players
Tochigi SC players
J.League U-22 Selection players
Association football midfielders